The Laundress or A Young Girl Doing Laundry (Une petite femme s'occupant à savonner) is the title of three oil paintings by the French artist Jean Siméon Chardin. The subject of laundresses, also known as washerwomen, was a popular one in art, especially in France.

Versions
Signed in the top left, the prime version of The Laundress dates to between 1733 and 1740. It formed part of the Crozat collection, which was mostly acquired by Catherine II of Russia on the advice of Denis Diderot in 1772, and so is now in the Hermitage Museum. It measures 38 by 48 cm.

A second version is now in the Nationalmuseum Stockholm; it is smaller (37.5 by 42.5 cm) and is signed in the centre on the stool under the tub. That version was exhibited at the 1737 Paris Salon and engraved by Cochin in 1739.

A third version (35 by 41 cm) was said to be mentioned in the inventory of Chardin's property compiled on the artist's death in 1779. It was in the Henri de Rothschild collection but was destroyed during the Second World War.

References

Bibliography
 
 
 
 
 
 
 
 
 

1733 paintings
Paintings in the collection of the Hermitage Museum
Paintings in the collection of the Nationalmuseum Stockholm
Paintings by Jean-Baptiste-Siméon Chardin
Paintings of children
Cats in art
Crozat collection
Lost paintings